Christopher D. "Chris" May is an American politician serving as a member of the Indiana House of Representatives from the 65th district. He assumed office on November 9, 2016.

Early life and education 
Born and raised in Oolitic, Indiana, May graduated from Bedford North Lawrence High School. He earned a Bachelor of Science degree in industrial and product design from Vincennes University in 1995.

Career 
Prior to entering politics, May worked in design and engineering positions at Ford Motor Company, Cook Group, General Motors, Otis Worldwide, and Whitney Tool Company. He later founded Hoosier Tech Properties. May also served as a member of the Lawrence County Board of Commissioners for three terms. He was elected to the Indiana House of Representatives in November 2016. Since 2019, he has served as vice chair of the House Local Government Committee.

References 

Living people
Republican Party members of the Indiana House of Representatives
People from Lawrence County, Indiana
Vincennes University alumni
Year of birth missing (living people)